Midlothian is a station on Metra's Rock Island District line located in Midlothian, Illinois. In Metra's zone-based fare structure, Midlothian is located in zone D. As of 2018, Midlothian is the 56th busiest of Metra's 236 non-downtown stations, with an average of 938 weekday boardings.

As of 2022, Midlothian is served by 21 trains in each direction on weekdays, by 10 inbound trains and 11 outbound trains on Saturdays, and by eight trains in each direction on Sundays.

Midlothian is located at grade level and consists of two side platforms which serve two tracks. There is a station house on the inbound platform where tickets can be purchased. Parking is available at the station along 147th Street as well as Waverly Avenue, Prairie Avenue, Hamlin Avenue, and Abbottsford Road.

Tracks
There are two tracks at Midlothian. Trains from Chicago run on track 2 (the north track) and trains to Chicago run on track 1 (the south track.)

Bus connections
Pace
  354 Harvey/Oak Forest Loop

References

External links

Flickr Photo
Station from 147th Street from Google Maps Street View

Metra stations in Illinois
Railway stations in Cook County, Illinois
2000 establishments in Illinois
Railway stations in the United States opened in 2000